Pink Bubbles Go Ape is the fourth studio album by German power metal band Helloween, released in 1991. It marked the departure of guitarist Kai Hansen, with Roland Grapow replacing him. It was also the first album released on EMI Records.

Background
The album contains two singles, which are "Kids of the Century" and "Number One". "Kids of the Century" reached #56 in the United Kingdom. The track "Heavy Metal Hamsters" (supposedly written about the band's former record company) was, according to Michael Weikath, never intended to be on the album, but rather on a B-side of a single.

Many disputes between the producer, bandmembers, management and the record company ensued. Weikath laid much of the blame at the feet of veteran Brit Metal producer Chris Tsangarides. Weikath said, “Straight away, I could tell things were going wrong, The show was being run by Michael and Ingo, and Chris simply didn’t like my songs. He couldn’t understand that certain cleverness they had.”  Weikath wanted Tommy Hansen to produce the album.

Also the band spent close to 400,000 pounds recording the new album. “The whole situation was bad,” Kiske said in 2017. “We spent a fortune in a studio in Denmark, but there was no inspiration.”

Storm Thorgerson designed the Pink Bubbles Go Ape’s cover and the girl on that cover is his niece. Thorgerson also directed the promo-video for "Kids of the Century."

Helloween had left Noise Records and turned to EMI. After the album was released, a lawsuit stopped Helloween from touring for a year. In the spring of 1992 an agreement was done, and they could finally play on a short European Tour starting in Hamburg 30 April 1992, and in the autumn they also played some shows in Japan.

Track listing

M - 12, 13 also appears on the single "Kids of the Century".
M - 14, 15 also appears on the single "Number One".

Personnel
Michael Kiske - vocals, acoustic guitar
Michael Weikath - guitar
Roland Grapow - guitar
Markus Grosskopf - bass
Ingo Schwichtenberg - drums

Additional
 Keyboards – Pete Iversen, Phil Nicholas

Recording information
 Produced, engineered and mixed by Chris Tsangarides. Recorded at PUK Studios Gjerlev, Denmark.
 "Heavy Metal Hamsters" , "I´m Doin´ Fine, Crazy Man", "Blue Suede Shoes" and "Shit and Lobster": Recorded at Sound House Studio, Hamburg, Germany. Produced by Helloween. Engineered by Dirk Steffens. Mixed by Chris Tsangarides. 
"Les Hambourgeois Walkways" and "You Run with the Pack": Produced and Mixed by Helloween and Dirk Steffens.

Charts

References

1991 albums
Helloween albums
Albums produced by Chris Tsangarides
Albums with cover art by Storm Thorgerson